The 2012–13 Binghamton Bearcats men's basketball team  represented Binghamton University during the 2012–13 NCAA Division I men's basketball season. The Bearcats, led by first year head coach Tommy Dempsey, played their home games at the Binghamton University Events Center and were members of the America East Conference.

The Bearcats finished the season with at 3–27, going 1–15 in American East play to finish in last place. They lost in the quarterfinals of the America East tournament to Stony Brook.

Previous season 
Binghamton lost the first 26 games of the 2011–12 season and were the last Division I school to remain winless until beating Vermont to end a two-season 27-game losing streak. The Bearcats finished the regular season with a 1–28 record, but beat UMBC in the first round of the America East tournament before losing to Stony Brook to end the season at 2–29, the worst record in school history and the second-worst winning percentage of all Division I schools during the season. As a result of the historically inept season, head coach Mark Macon and his staff were fired.

Roster

Schedule

|-
!colspan=9 style="background:#; color:white;"| Exhibition

|-
!colspan=9 style="background:#; color:white;"| Regular season

|-
!colspan=9 style="background:#; color:white;"| America East regular season

|-
!colspan=12 style=| America East tournament

References

Binghamton Bearcats men's basketball seasons
Binghamton
Bingham Bear
Bingham Bear